Manuel Pancorbo Chica (born 7 July 1966  in Torredelcampo, Jaén) is a retired track and field athlete. He competed in the middle distances.

Pancorbo represented his native country Spain at two consecutive Summer Olympics in 1992 and 1996. He won the silver medal in the men's 3,000 metres at the 1998 European Indoor Championships.

Pancorbo is the first Spaniard to win the Cross Internacional de Soria and the only male athlete to do so.

References
Spanish Olympic Committee

Spanish male middle-distance runners
Athletes (track and field) at the 1992 Summer Olympics
Athletes (track and field) at the 1996 Summer Olympics
Olympic athletes of Spain
1966 births
Living people
European Athletics Championships medalists
20th-century Spanish people